Pablo Javier Lanz (born March 19, 1979) is an Argentine former professional footballer who played as a goalkeeper.

Career
Lanz was born in Buenos Aires. He began his career at the youth sector of Argentine club Platense. Although he worked his way up to the first team, he made his professional debut in the Liga de Fútbol Profesional Boliviano playing for Real Santa Cruz in 2002. After three years with Real, his spell in Bolivia extended as he also played for Destroyers, Bolívar, Real Mamoré and Blooming.

In January 2009, he relocated to Peru where he signed for Alianza Atlético from the Primera División Peruana. In 2010, he returned to Bolivia and joined Real Mamoré for his second spell.

References

External links
 
 

1979 births
Living people
Argentine people of German descent
Argentine footballers
Association football goalkeepers
Club Atlético Platense footballers
Club Blooming players
Club Destroyers players
Club Bolívar players
Alianza Atlético footballers
Municipal Real Mamoré players
Argentine expatriate footballers
Argentine expatriate sportspeople in Bolivia
Expatriate footballers in Bolivia
Argentine expatriate sportspeople in Peru
Expatriate footballers in Peru
Footballers from Buenos Aires